Cajazeiras is a municipality in the state of Paraíba in the Northeast Region of Brazil. It has a population of 62,289 as of 2020.

See also

List of municipalities in Paraíba

References

Municipalities in Paraíba